A park by wire system engages the parking pawl of a transmission using electrical means. This can also be considered as part of a shift by wire system whose objective is to put the vehicle in Park, Reverse, Neutral and Drive modes without the traditional mechanical system which involves linkages between the gear shifter and the transmission. The main components of a park by wire system include the driver interface which could be a lever, switch or knob as designed by the OEM (input), an electronic control unit to host the control system and actuators (one or two motors) which are capable of driving the parking pawl into and out of the locking position with the parking gear of the transmission.

See also
Shift by wire
Drive by wire
Electric park brake
Parking pawl
Automatic transmission

References

Automotive transmission technologies
Vehicle safety technologies